Ellery Channing Huntington Jr. (March 11, 1893 – July 2, 1987) was an American football player and coach.  He played college football as a quarterback at Colgate University.  Huntington also served as the 19th head football coach at Colgate, holding that position for three seasons, from 1919 until 1921 and compiling a record of 10–10–5.  He was elected to the College Football Hall of Fame in 1972.

In World War II, Huntington worked directly for William J. Donovan in the Office of Strategic Services and was instrumental in secret work for the Allies, especially during the invasion of North Africa.

Head coaching record

References

External links
 New York Times obituary
 
 

1893 births
1987 deaths
American football quarterbacks
Colgate Raiders football coaches
Colgate Raiders football players
All-American college football players
College Football Hall of Fame inductees
People from Madison County, New York
Coaches of American football from New York (state)
Players of American football from New York (state)
Players of American football from Nashville, Tennessee